Ethyl biscoumacetate is a vitamin K antagonist.

References 

 The Merck Index, 12th Edition. 3818

Coumarin drugs
Ethyl esters